Statistics of Scottish Football League in season 1972/1973.

Scottish League Division One

Scottish League Division Two

See also
1972–73 in Scottish football

References

 
Scottish Football League seasons